Dimsdale is a suburb in Newcastle-under-Lyme, England.

Dimsdale also may refer to:

Places
Dimsdale, Alberta, Canada
Dimsdale (Wishaw), Scotland

People with the surname
Dimsdale baronets, a title in the Baronetage of the United Kingdom
Robert Dimsdale (1828–1898), English banker and politician
Thomas Dimsdale (1712–1800), English physician, banker and politician
Baron Dimsdale, a title conferred on the physician by the Russian Royal Family

See also
Dimmsdale, California, the fictional setting of The Fairly OddParents
Arthur Dimmesdale, a fictional character in The Scarlet Letter by Nathaniel Hawthorne (1850)